Djigoue is a department or commune of Poni Province in southern Burkina Faso.  Its population in 2006 was 20,319 residents. Its capital is Djigoue.

Towns and villages
The department and the municipality of Djigoué consists of 28 villages including the eponymous capital (from the consensus report of 2006):

 Babrora (75 residents)
 Badora (217 residents)
 Bawé-Bininbom (1 024 residents)
 Bawé-Dara (1 928 residents)
 Birira (3 483 residents)
 Bourio-Gan (223 residents)
 Djatakoro (927 residents)
 Djigoué (2 266 residents), capital
 Dompo (195 residents)
 Donkua (Namyaré) (636 residents)
 Filakora (597 residents)
 Gongomboulo (938 residents)
 Hélintira (1 651 residents)
 Kaléboukoura (293 residents)
 Kankongno (404 residents)
 Kankongo (505 residents)
 Mampoura (929 residents)
 Moulépo (306 residents)
 Nahinéna (351 residents)
 N'Donhira (161 residents)
 Pokamboulo (602 residents)
 Sarmassi-Gan (526 residents)
 Sarmassi-Lobi (260 residents)
 Terpo (599 residents)
 Tiébon (Dimbo) (830 residents)
 Tiwéra (273 residents)

References

Departments of Burkina Faso
Poni Province